Givira albosignata is a moth in the family Cossidae. It is found in Chile.

The wingspan is 26.5 mm for females.

References

Natural History Museum Lepidoptera generic names catalog

Givira
Endemic fauna of Chile
Moths described in 1957